is a railway station on the Hokuriku Main Line in the city of Komatsu, Ishikawa, Japan, operated by West Japan Railway Company (JR West).

Lines

Station layout
The station consists of two opposed unnumbered side platforms connected by a level crossing. The station is unattended.

Platforms

History
Meihō Station opened on 10 October 1988.

Surrounding area
Komatsu Kita High School
Komatsu Meihō School

See also
 List of railway stations in Japan

References

External links 

  

Stations of West Japan Railway Company
Railway stations in Ishikawa Prefecture
Railway stations in Japan opened in 1988
Hokuriku Main Line
Komatsu, Ishikawa